Matuszczak is a surname. Notable people with the surname include:

 Bernadetta Matuszczak (1937–2021), Polish composer
 Walter Matuszczak (1918–2001), American football player

See also 
 Matuszczyk

Polish-language surnames